Chahar Divar may refer to:
 Chahar Divar, Kermanshah
 Chahar Divar, West Azerbaijan